1954–55 was the forty-seventh occasion on which the  Yorkshire Cup competition had been held.

Halifax winning the trophy by beating Hull F.C. by the score of 22-14

The match was played at Headingley, Leeds, now in West Yorkshire. The attendance was 25,949 and receipts were £4,638

This was the  first of Halifax's two successive victories, both against Hull FC, for whom it was their second of three successive Cup final defeats

Background 

This season there were no junior/amateur clubs taking part, no new entrants and no "leavers" and so the total of entries remained the  same at sixteen.

This in turn resulted in no byes in the first round.

Last season saw the  end of the  two-legged home and away ties, and reverted to the  whole competition being based on a simple knock-out formulae

Competition and results

Round 1 
Involved  8 matches (with no byes) and 16 clubs

Round 1 - replays  
Involved  1 match and 2 clubs

Round 2 - quarterfinals 
Involved 4 matches and 8 clubs

Round 2 - replays  
Involved  1 match and 2 clubs

Round 3 – semifinals  
Involved 2 matches and 4 clubs

Final

Teams and scorers 

Scoring - Try = three (3) points - Goal = two (2) points - Drop goal = two (2) points

The road to success

Notes and comments 
1 * Headingley, Leeds, is the home ground of Leeds RLFC with a capacity of 21,000. The record attendance was  40,175 for a league match between Leeds and Bradford Northern on 21 May 1947.

General information for those unfamiliar 
The Rugby League Yorkshire Cup competition was a knock-out competition between (mainly professional) rugby league clubs from  the  county of Yorkshire. The actual area was at times increased to encompass other teams from  outside the  county such as Newcastle, Mansfield, Coventry, and even London (in the form of Acton & Willesden).

The Rugby League season always (until the onset of "Summer Rugby" in 1996) ran from around August-time through to around May-time and this competition always took place early in the season, in the Autumn, with the final taking place in (or just before) December (The only exception to this was when disruption of the fixture list was caused during, and immediately after, the two World Wars)

See also 
1954–55 Northern Rugby Football League season
Rugby league county cups

References

External links
Saints Heritage Society
1896–97 Northern Rugby Football Union season at wigan.rlfans.com
Hull&Proud Fixtures & Results 1896/1897
Widnes Vikings - One team, one passion Season In Review - 1896-97
The Northern Union at warringtonwolves.org

1954 in English rugby league
RFL Yorkshire Cup